Biberach is an electoral constituency (German: Wahlkreis) represented in the Bundestag. It elects one member via first-past-the-post voting. Under the current constituency numbering system, it is designated as constituency 292. It is located in southeastern Baden-Württemberg, comprising the Biberach district and northeastern parts of the Ravensburg district.

Biberach was created for the inaugural 1949 federal election. Since 2009, it has been represented by Josef Rief of the Christian Democratic Union (CDU).

Geography
Biberach is located in southeastern Baden-Württemberg. As of the 2021 federal election, it comprises the district of Biberach and the municipalities of Aichstetten, Aitrach, Bad Wurzach, and Kißlegg from the Ravensburg district.

History
Biberach was created in 1949. In the 1949 election, it was Württemberg-Hohenzollern constituency 5 in the numbering system. In the 1953 through 1961 elections, it was number 194. In the 1965 through 1976 elections, it was number 198. In the 1980 through 1998 elections, it was number 196. In the 2002 and 2005 elections, it was number 293. Since the 2009 election, it has been number 292.

Originally, the constituency comprised the districts of Biberach, Saulgau, and Ehingen. In the 1965 through 1976 elections, it also contained the municipalities of Billafingen, Burgau, and Langenenslingen from the Sigmaringen district. In the 1980 election, it acquired a configuration similar to its current borders, but also containing the municipalities of Achberg, Amtzell, Argenbühl, Bad Waldsee, Bergatreute, Isny, Leutkirch, Vogt, Wangen, and Wolfegg from the Ravensburg district. It acquired its current borders in the 2009 election.

Members
The constituency has been held continuously by Christian Democratic Union (CDU) since its creation. It was first represented by Bernhard Bauknecht from 1949 to 1969, followed by Eugen Maucher from 1969 to 1976 and Isidor Früh from 1976 to 1980. Alois Graf von Waldburg-Zeil was representative from 1980 to 1998, followed by Franz Romer from 1998 to 2009. Josef Rief was elected in 2009, and re-elected in 2013, 2017, and 2021.

Election results

2021 election

2017 election

2013 election

2009 election

References

Federal electoral districts in Baden-Württemberg
1949 establishments in West Germany
Constituencies established in 1949
Biberach (district)
Ravensburg (district)